James "Jimmy" Maurer (born October 14, 1988) is an American professional soccer player who plays as a goalkeeper for Major League Soccer club FC Dallas.

Career

College and amateur
Maurer attended college at the University of South Carolina and was the starting goalkeeper for four years. During his four-year career, he started all 78 games for the Gamecocks. He finished his collegiate career with 28 shutouts, second in South Carolina history. In his first year in 2007, Maurer started all 19 games for the Gamecocks and recorded a 1.08 goals against average. He was also named Conference USA Freshman of the Year. In 2009 as a junior, Maurer played every minute in net for South Carolina and had a 1.22 goals against average to go along with five shutouts and being named to the All-Conference USA Third Team. He was named to the 2010 All-Conference USA Second Team during his senior campaign in which he recorded nine shutouts and a career-high 2,028 minutes in net, including the South Carolina–Clemson rivalry, where he finished off an unprecedented shutout of the derby archrivals.

Maurer played with various clubs in the USL Premier Development League during his collegiate career. In 2008, he played for the Atlanta Silverbacks U23's and in 2009, with Chicago Fire Premier. While with Chicago, he was named the 2009 PDL season Goalkeeper of the Year and played in the PDL Championship game. He concluded his PDL career playing with Atlanta Blackhawks in 2010.

Professional
Maurer was selected 4th overall in the 2011 MLS Supplemental Draft by the New York Red Bulls. He spent the pre-season with the club but was not signed to a contract. However, the club did sign him to a one-game contract to serve as a backup for a match on March 26, 2011, due to an injury and an international call-up to its two regular keepers.

NASL and Chile 
On March 31, 2011, Maurer signed with the Atlanta Silverbacks of the North American Soccer League. He made his professional debut on April 9, 2011, in a game against the NSC Minnesota Stars

On January 31, 2012, Maurer signed with Club Deportivo Universidad de Concepción of the Chilean Primera División. His relocation to Chile was filmed for an episode of the HGTV show House Hunters International, where he was negotiating on low income rentals as he had not yet signed a contract with the team.

Maurer signed with NASL club New York Cosmos on April 26, 2013. He served as the backup goalkeeper to starter Kyle Reynish during the 2013 NASL season, which ended with a championship when the Cosmos defeated the Atlanta Silverbacks 1–0 to claim the NASL Soccer Bowl. Maurer made his debut with the Cosmos on November 2, 2013, against the Atlanta Silverbacks making four saves and posting a 1–0 shutout victory.

Maurer entered the 2014 NASL season as the starting goalkeeper for the Cosmos. He allowed just three goals during the 2014 Spring season, posting 29 saves and an NASL-leading 0.33 GAA (goals against average) in nine games. Maurer also posted a modern-day NASL record 372 minute shutout streak during the Spring season and achieved a record of 6–1–2 (W-D-L). He recorded a league-high 11 shutouts in 24 appearances for the Cosmos in the 2014 regular season. His 0.91 GAA was second best in the league, and he finished tied for second in the league in saves (67). Maurer posted a 10–7–6 record on the year and was named to the NASL Team of the Week twice during 2014. These accolades resulted in Maurer being named to the NASL Best XI at the conclusion of the 2014 season.

In 2015, Maurer started 28 out of 30 NASL fixtures for the Cosmos, as well as both of the Championship matches. He logged 12 shutouts and a 0.93 GAA in a title-winning season for the Cosmos.

FC Dallas 
On December 18, 2017, Maurer signed with Major League Soccer side FC Dallas.

International
Maurer was a member of the United States U-17 player pool from 2004 through 2006.

Club statistics

Honors 

New York Cosmos
 NASL Soccer Bowl: 2013, 2015, 2016
NASL Regular Season: 2015, 2016

North Texas SC
 USL League One: 2019

References

External links
 
 
 South Carolina Profile
 Jimmy Maurer at New York Cosmos
 

1988 births
Living people
People from Lawrenceville, Georgia
Sportspeople from the Atlanta metropolitan area
Soccer players from Georgia (U.S. state)
American soccer players
Association football goalkeepers
South Carolina Gamecocks men's soccer players
Atlanta Silverbacks U23's players
Chicago Fire U-23 players
Atlanta Blackhawks players
New York Red Bulls draft picks
New York Red Bulls players
Atlanta Silverbacks players
Universidad de Concepción footballers
New York Cosmos (2010) players
FC Dallas players
North Texas SC players
USL League Two players
USL League One players
Chilean Primera División players
Major League Soccer players
North American Soccer League players
American expatriate soccer players
American expatriate sportspeople in Chile
Expatriate footballers in Chile